Sergei Sergeyevich Shashkov (born 7 December 1972 in Kurgan) is a former Russian football player.

References

1972 births
People from Kurgan, Kurgan Oblast
Living people
Soviet footballers
Russian footballers
FC Tobol Kurgan players
FC Lokomotiv Nizhny Novgorod players
Russian Premier League players
FC Energiya Volzhsky players
FC Orenburg players
Association football midfielders
Association football forwards
Sportspeople from Kurgan Oblast